Niger has participated in two Africa Cup of Nations, the 2012 and 2013 editions.

Historically, Niger has been considered a much weaker side in the strong West African Football Union, and didn't have much success in major tournament's qualification. Until 2010s, Niger had never qualified for any AFCON editions. However, Niger produced a stunning qualifying run in 2012 Africa Cup of Nations qualification, overcame giants like Egypt and South Africa to book its final debut, where they lost all three matches. Niger once again participated a year in later in the same edition, obtained one point though unable to prevent early elimination. Since then, Niger haven't qualified for the tournament.

Records

Matches

2012 Africa Cup of Nations
Group A

2013 Africa Cup of Nations
Group B

References

External links
Africa Cup of Nations - Archives competitions - cafonline.com

Niger national football team
Countries at the Africa Cup of Nations